Phelsuma vanheygeni is a species of gecko, a lizard in the family Gekkonidae. The species is endemic to Madagascar.

Etymology
The specific name, vanheygeni, is in honor of Belgian herpetologist Emmanuel Van Heygen, who collected the holotype.

Geographic range
P. vanheygeni is found on the Ampasindava peninsula in northern Madagascar.

Habitat

Description
It is somewhat slender and rather flattened. The dorsal coloration of living specimens (including the head, neck, limbs and tail) is vivid green. There are some small red dots irregularly positioned on the lower back and upper tail; males have usually slightly bigger red dots. The green dorsal coloration is delimited by a yellowish stripe that begins at the rostral scale, continues backwards over the supralabial scales, under the ear opening, and widens at the axilla. The ventral coloration is dirty white; the subcaudal scales have a brown to black pigmentation at their tips. The Ventral and subcaudal scales are smooth (not keeled).

Reproduction
P. vanheygeni is oviparous and glues its eggs to the inside of bamboo stems.

References

Further reading
Berghof H-P (2014). "Pflege und Vermehrung von Phelsuma pronki Seipp, 1994 und Phelsuma vanheygeni Lerner, 2004". Reptilia, Münster 19 (105): 38–43. (in German).
Glaw F, Rösler H (2015). "Taxonomic checklist of the day geckos of the genera Phelsuma Gray, 1825 and Rhoptropella Hewitt, 1937 (Squamata: Gekkonidae)". Vertebrate Zoology 65 (2): 247–283.
Lerner A (2004). "A new taxonomically isolated species of the genus Phelsuma Gray, 1825 from the Ampasindava peninsula, Madagascar". Phelsuma 12: 91–98. (Phelsuma vanheygeni, new species).

Phelsuma
Geckos of Africa
Reptiles of Madagascar
Endemic fauna of Madagascar
Reptiles described in 2004